Sphacelodes vulneraria is a species of geometrid moth in the family Geometridae. It is found in the Caribbean Sea, Central America, North America, and South America.

The MONA or Hodges number for Sphacelodes vulneraria is 6800.

References

Further reading

External links

 

Ennominae
Articles created by Qbugbot
Moths described in 1823